Kevin Schreiber Willard (born April 6, 1975) is an American college basketball coach and the current head men's basketball coach at the University of Maryland. Willard played basketball at Western Kentucky during the 1992–93 season (his freshman year) before transferring to Pittsburgh to finish his playing career.

Willard's father, Ralph Willard, was the associate head coach at Louisville and a former head men's basketball coach at Holy Cross, Pittsburgh and Western Kentucky.

Willard started his coaching career in the NBA ranks, working on the bench with coach Rick Pitino of the Boston Celtics. After Pitino resigned from the Celtics in 2001, Willard followed him to Louisville, and spent the next six years there as his assistant.

He is the former head coach of Iona College, where he took over the reins after Jeff Ruland was fired after going 2–28 in 2007. Willard came to Iona after spending ten years as an assistant under Rick Pitino. In his third season with Iona, Willard led the Gaels to the 14th 20-win season in program history. It was a nine-win improvement from his first two seasons in New Rochelle. After inheriting a program that was 10th to last in the Ratings Percentage Index (RPI), the Gaels improved to a Top 80 RPI in 2009–10, the highest turnaround over the time span in NCAA Division I. After completing the turnaround, on March 28, 2010 Willard accepted the head coaching position at Seton Hall University, a school that competes in the Big East Conference. He led the Pirates to the 2016 Big East championship. On March 14, 2019, he became the first Pirates head coach to lead the team to four straight 20 win seasons. After Seton Hall beat Rutgers University on December 12th, 2021, Willard passed P.J. Carlesimo for second place in program history with 213 wins. Only Honey Russell (295) has more wins than Willard. On March 21, 2022, Willard accepted a job to be the next head basketball coach at the University of Maryland.

Head coaching record

Footnotes

References

External links

1975 births
Living people
American men's basketball coaches
American men's basketball players
Basketball coaches from New York (state)
Basketball players from New York (state)
Boston Celtics assistant coaches
Bowling Green High School (Kentucky) alumni
College men's basketball head coaches in the United States
Iona Gaels men's basketball coaches
Louisville Cardinals men's basketball coaches
People from Huntington, New York
Pittsburgh Panthers men's basketball players
Point guards
Seton Hall Pirates men's basketball coaches
Sportspeople from Suffolk County, New York
Western Kentucky Hilltoppers basketball players